The 2016 Kentucky Bank Tennis Championships was a professional tennis tournament played on outdoor hard courts. It was the 21st edition, for men, and 19th edition, for women, of the tournament and part of the 2016 ATP Challenger Tour and the 2016 ITF Women's Circuit, offering totals of $50,000, for both genders, in prize money. It took place in Lexington, Kentucky, United States, on 25–31 July 2016.

Men's singles main draw entrants

Seeds

 1 Rankings as of 18 July 2016.

Other entrants
The following players received a wildcard into the singles main draw:
  Brian Baker
  Eric Quigley
  Ryan Shane
  William Bushamuka

The following player entered as an alternate:
  Juan Ignacio Londero

The following players received entry from the qualifying draw:
  Lloyd Glasspool
  Alex Kuznetsov
  Mackenzie McDonald
  Jesse Witten

Women's singles main draw entrants

Seeds

 1 Rankings as of 18 July 2016.

Other entrants
The following players received a wildcard into the singles main draw:
  Francesca Di Lorenzo
  Raveena Kingsley
  Jamie Loeb
  Melanie Oudin

The following players received entry from the qualifying draw:
  Alison Bai
  Cristiana Ferrando
  Greet Minnen
  Olivia Rogowska

The following players received entry as lucky losers:
  Katy Dunne
  Laura Robson
  Emily Webley-Smith

Champions

Men's singles

 Ernesto Escobedo def.  Frances Tiafoe, 6–2, 6–7(6–8), 7–6(7–3)

Women's singles

 Michaëlla Krajicek def.  Arina Rodionova, 6–0, 2–6, 6–2

Men's doubles

 Luke Saville /  Jordan Thompson def.  Nicolaas Scholtz /  Tucker Vorster, 6–2, 7–5

Women's doubles

 Hiroko Kuwata /  Zhu Lin def.  Sophie Chang /  Alexandra Mueller, 6–0, 7–5

External links
 2016 Kentucky Bank Tennis Championships at ITFtennis.com
 Official website

2016 ITF Women's Circuit
2016 ATP Challenger Tour
2016 in American tennis
Lexington Challenger